Nicrophorus morio is a burying beetle described by Gebler in 1817.

References

Silphidae
Beetles of North America
Beetles described in 1817